SuckPump is the first album by New York industrial band Bile, released in 1994. The album was released on the now-defunct Energy Records. Bile re-released the album in 2003 alongside their out-of-print second release, Teknowhore, as a digipak titled Frankenhole.

SuckPump was written and recorded by Chris 'Krztoff' Liggio and produced and engineered by David 'Slave' Stagnari, Robert 'Void' Caprio, and Krztoff (reported on the album as Kristoff).

"I Reject" was part of the soundtrack of the 1995 film adaptation of Mortal Kombat.

Critical reception
The Encyclopedia of Popular Music gave the album 4 stars (out of 5) and called it a "classic." The Washington Post wrote that the songs "are formed around ordinary dance tracks, then fed through a meat grinder of distorted vocals and crushing guitars, resulting in tunes that would be almost catchy but for the throbbing instrumental attack."

Track listing 
All songs written by Chris Liggio except "Burnt" by Liggio and Eric Meneses

 "Head" - 5:26
 "Burnt" - 3:56
 "Ura Fucking Loser" - 5:16
 "I Reject" - 2:56
 "Feeling Like Shit" - 4.13
 "Get Out" - 4:21
 "Suckpump" - 9:01
 "Get Out (Radio Edit)" - 4.25

Credits 
Live band members
 Krztoff (Chris Liggio) - vocals
 Eric Roi (Eric Meneses) - vocals
 Archie A.K. - vocals
 Brett (Brett Pirozzi) - bass guitar
 Jeff X. - guitars
 R.H. Bear (Rick Boeckel) - keyboards
 Omen (Damion Troy) - cybercussion
 Sin-D - sex
 Mr. and Mrs. Clown 
 Bobabuse (Bob Noble) - beatings
 Mclusky - lights

Production
Produced and engineered by Slave a.k.a. David Stagnari, Void, and Krztoff
Programming and additional sounds by Slave a.k.a. David Stagnari
Tape edited by Void
Recorded at Music Palace, Strong Island, N.Y.
Mastered by Howie Weinberg at Masterdisk
Management - Ramsey Jabbar for Aggression Inc.
Design - Mary Jane Leonti Design Group
Illustration - Gina Volpe

References

Bile (band) albums
1994 debut albums